In mathematics, Weingarten functions are rational functions indexed by partitions of integers that can be used to calculate integrals of products of matrix coefficients over classical groups.

Unitary groups
Weingarten functions are used for evaluating integrals over the unitary group Ud 
of products of matrix coefficients of the form

where  denotes complex conjugation.

This integral is equal to 

where Wg is the Weingarten function, given by

where the sum is over all partitions λ of q . Here χλ is the character of Sq corresponding to the partition λ and s is the Schur polynomial of λ, so that sλd(1) is the dimension of the representation of Ud corresponding to λ.

The Weingarten functions are rational functions in d. They can have poles for small values of d, which cancel out in the formula above. There is an alternative inequivalent definition of Weingarten functions, where one only sums over partitions with at most d parts. This is no longer a rational function of d, but is finite for all positive integers d. The two sorts of Weingarten functions coincide for d larger than q, and either can be used in the formula for the integral.

Values of the Weingarten function for simple permutations
The first few Weingarten functions Wg(σ, d) are
 (The trivial case where q = 0)

where permutations σ are denoted by their cycle shapes.

There exist computer algebra programs to produce these expressions.

Explicit expressions for the integrals in the first cases 
The explicit expressions for the integrals of first- and second-degree polynomials, obtained via the formula above, are:

Asymptotic behavior
For large d, the Weingarten function Wg has the asymptotic behavior

where the permutation σ is a product of cycles of lengths Ci, and cn = (2n)!/n!(n + 1)! is a Catalan number, and |σ| is the smallest number of transpositions that σ is a product of. There exists a diagrammatic method to systematically calculate the integrals over the unitary group as a power series in 1/d.

Orthogonal and symplectic groups
Their theory is similar to the case of the unitary group. They are parameterized by partitions such that all parts have even size.

External links

References

Random matrices
Mathematical physics